Zisis Sarikopoulos (alternate spelling: Zissis) (Greek: Ζήσης Σαρικόπουλος; born March 31, 1990 in Athens, Greece) is a Greek professional basketball player for Karditsa of the Greek Basket League. His nickname is "Big Z".

Early years
Sarikopoulos began playing basketball with the youth teams of the Greek club Olympiacos. He played at the 2007 Jordan Brand Classic International game.

College career
Sarikopoulos played college basketball at UAB, with the UAB Blazers, and at Ohio State, with the Ohio State Buckeyes. He left Ohio State early, to play pro basketball in Greece. Sarikopoulos averaged 1.35 points per game in his NCAA Division I career.

Professional career
In 2010, Sarikopoulos began his professional career with the Greek League club Panionios. In 2012, he moved to the Greek club Aris. In 2014, he joined the Greek club AEK Athens.

On July 17, 2016, Sarikopoulos signed with the Greek team Promitheas Patras. He returned to Panionios for the 2017–18 season.

On August 22, 2018, Sarikopoulos signed with the Belarusian team Tsmoki-Minsk.

On August 30, 2019, he signed with PAOK of the Greek Basket League.

On March 11, 2021, he signed with Iraklis of the Greek Basket League.

On October 5, 2021, he signed with Al Sadd of the Qatari Basketball League (QBL).

On November 10, 2022, Sarikopoulos returned to PAOK for the rest of the season. He left the club after appearing in only two games and instead joined Karditsa.

National team career
Sarikopoulos was a member of the Greek junior national teams. With the junior national teams of Greece, he played at the following tournaments: the 2005 FIBA Europe Under-16 Championship, the 2006 FIBA Europe Under-16 Championship, the 2007 FIBA Europe Under-18 Championship, the 2008 FIBA Europe Under-18 Championship the 2009 FIBA Under-19 World Championship, the 2009 FIBA Europe Under-20 Championship, and the 2010 FIBA Europe Under-20 Championship.

In 2012, he was invited to practice with the senior men's Greek national basketball team, for the first time. In 2015, he was invited as a training camp player of the Greek senior men's national team for the first time.

Career statistics

Domestic Leagues

Regular season

|-
| 2010–11
| style="text-align:left;"| Panionios
| align=left | GBL
| 16  || 4.4 || .437 || .000 || .250 ||  0.8 || 0.0 || 0.1 || 0.1 || 0.9
|-
| 2011–12
| style="text-align:left;"| Panionios
| align=left | GBL
| 21  || 7.4 || .733 || .000 || .550 ||  1.2 || 0.1 || 0.3 || 0.2 || 3.6
|-
| 2012–13
| style="text-align:left;"| Aris
| align=left | GBL
| 22  || 13.3 || .723 || .000 || .500 ||  3.2 || 0.5 || 0.3 || 0.5 || 4.7
|-
| 2013–14
| style="text-align:left;"| Aris
| align=left | GBL
| 17  || 12.3 || .564 || .000 || .451 ||  3.8 || 0.1 || 0.1 || 0.7 || 4.9
|-
| 2014–15
| style="text-align:left;"| AEK
| align=left | GBL
| 22  || 17.3 || .666 || .000 || .511 ||  4.7 || 0.9 || 0.3 || 0.6 || 6.6
|-
| 2015–16
| style="text-align:left;"| AEK
| align=left | GBL
| 15  || 8.5 || .666 || .000 || .933 ||  2.7 || 0.3 || 0.3 || 0.4 || 3.1
|-
| 2016–17
| style="text-align:left;"| Promitheas
| align=left | GBL
| 22  ||  13.4 || .648 || .000 || .512 ||  3.2 || 0.3 || 0.2 || 0.3 || 5.1
|-
| 2017–18
| style="text-align:left;"| Panionios
| align=left | GBL
| 26 || 20.5 || .701 || .000 || .542 ||  4.6 || 0.7 || 0.4 || 0.5 || 9.4
|-
| 2018–19
| style="text-align:left;"| Tsmoki-Minsk
| align=left | VTB
| 26  || 24.4 || .614  || .000 || .642 || 6.7 || 1.2 || 0.8 || 0.9 || 10.1
|-
| 2019–20
| style="text-align:left;"| PAOK
| align=left | GBL
| 20 || 16.5 || .535 || .000 || .742 ||  5.3 || 0.9 || 0.3 || 0.4 || 5.8
|-
| 2020–21
| style="text-align:left;"| Iraklis
| align=left | GBL
| 2 || 7.5 || .333 || .000 || .000 ||  1.0 || 0.5 || 0.0 || 0.0 || 1.0
|-
| 2021–22
| style="text-align:left;"| Al Sadd
| align=left | QBL
| 29 || 35.7 || .673 || .667 || .593 || 14.5 || 2.2 || 0.7 || 1.1 || 17.7
|-

|}

Playoffs

|-
| 2011–12
| style="text-align:left;"| Panionios
| align=left | GBL
| 9  || 13.4 || .735 || .000 || .312 ||  3.0 || 0.5 || 1.0 || 1.0 || 6.1
|-
| 2012–13
| style="text-align:left;"| Aris
| align=left | GBL
| 3  || 7.3 || 1.000 || .000 || .666 ||  1.3 || 0.0 || 0.3 || 0.0 || 2.0
|-
| 2013–14
| style="text-align:left;"| Aris
| align=left | GBL
| 2  || 12.4 || .333 || .000 || .833 ||  3.5 || 0.0 || 0.0 || 0.0 || 3.5
|-
| 2014–15
| style="text-align:left;"| AEK
| align=left | GBL
| 3  || 14.0 || .600 || .000 || .400 ||  6.0 || 0.3 || 0.6 || 0.0 || 4.6
|-
| 2015–16
| style="text-align:left;"| AEK
| align=left | GBL
| 6  || 5.3 || .500 || .000 || .000 ||  1.7 || 0.2 || 0.2 || 0.0 || 0.3
|-

|}

References

External links
EuroCup profile
FIBA profile
Eurobasket.com profile
Greek Basket League profile 
Hellenic Federation profile 
Ohio State Buckeyes bio
UAB Blazers bio
ESPN profile
VTB United League

1990 births
Living people
AEK B.C. players
Aris B.C. players
ASK Karditsas B.C. players
BC Tsmoki-Minsk players
Centers (basketball)
Greek Basket League players
Greek expatriate basketball people in the United States
Greek men's basketball players
Iraklis Thessaloniki B.C. players
Ohio State Buckeyes men's basketball players
Panionios B.C. players
P.A.O.K. BC players
Promitheas Patras B.C. players
UAB Blazers men's basketball players
Basketball players from Athens